Wielkie Czyste  is a village in the administrative district of Gmina Stolno, within Chełmno County, Kuyavian-Pomeranian Voivodeship, in north-central Poland. It is located in the Chełmno Land in the historic region of Pomerania.

The village has a population of 120.

The landmark of Wielkie Czyste is the Gothic church of St. Catherine, built in the 13th century.

History
During the German occupation (World War II), local Polish priests were murdered by the Germans in a massacre of Poles committed in 1939 in nearby Klamry as part of the Intelligenzaktion.

References

Wielkie Czyste